Sherdil: The Pilibhit Saga is a 2022  Indian Hindi-language adventure drama film which is written and directed by Srijit Mukherji and produced by T-Series and Reliance Entertainment Studios. The film stars Pankaj Tripathi, Sayani Gupta and Neeraj Kabi in the lead roles. The film was released theatrically on 24 June 2022. This film marked the last film of playback singer KK who passed away 1 month before the release.

Plot 
Gangaram is the Sarpanch (leader) of a remote village in Uttar Pradesh, India. His village has been suffering from famine and crop failure, exacerbated by wildlife encroachment. During an unsuccessful visit to a government office to seek poverty aid, he glances upon a poster that stated that the kin of victims of fatal tiger encounters in areas bordering tiger reserves would be entitled to a ₹10,00,000 compensation from the Govt. of India. In a desperate attempt to alleviate the conditions of his village, Gangaram plots to sacrifice himself in a tiger attack. During his search for a tiger, his path crosses with that of a poacher (Jim Ahmed) with whom he forms an unconventional partnership. The story then follows his journey, highlighting social issues faced by the lesser fortunate.

Gangaram unites with the poacher and both go looking for a tiger. After many days they find a tiger. Gangaram walks toward the tiger and the poacher is ready to shoot it. But the tiger is full and walks away. Forest officers follow them and shoot the poacher and take Gangaram into custody. Gangaram's story becomes famous all over India. He is pardoned from the court.

In the final scene, Gangaram comes back to the jungle in 4 wheelers with officers who want to promote tourism. Gangaram wants to take a leak and he goes to the jungle alone and is attacked by a tiger.

Cast
 Pankaj Tripathi as Gangaram "Gangu"
 Sayani Gupta as Lajwanti "Lajjo"
 Neeraj Kabi as Jim Ahmed
 Rk Rakesh Boro as Ritvi
 Akshay Kapoor as DFO

Soundtrack
The music rights of the film are owned by T Series. The music is composed by Shantanu Moitra. The first single titled "Dhoop Paani Bahne De" was released on 6 June 2022.

Release

Home media
The digital streaming rights of the film were sold to Netflix. The film was digitally streamed on Netflix from 20 August 2022.

References

External links
 
 

2020s Hindi-language films
2022 drama films
2022 films